Yenifel Vicente (born 26 June 1986) is a Dominican professional boxer. He held the WBA Fedelatin super-bantamweight title from 2010 to 2011 and the WBC FECARBOX super-bantamweight title in 2011. He has also been featured in the top 10 of the WBA rankings.

Career
On November 29, 2010 he defeated Jonathan Perez for the WBA Fedelatin super bantamweight title.

On July 27, 2019 he challenged Tramaine Williams for the United States Boxing Association and North American Boxing Organization super bantamweight titles, losing by unanimous decision.

References

External links

Living people
1986 births
Dominican Republic male boxers
Super-bantamweight boxers
Featherweight boxers
People from Azua Province